According to the Russian legislation, a Russian Mortgage Certificate is a security that verifies its holder’s right to real estate pledged as a security for a mortgage loan. As nearly elsewhere, Russian Mortgage Certificates
are often used as underlying asset and collateral for securities issued and sold to investors in the course of securitisation. The above-mentioned securities are often called RMBS - Residential Mortgage Backed Securities.
Any interested buyers or investors can:
 either buy Russian Mortgage Certificates directly from their current holders which are often primary lenders
 or they can buy RMBS collateralized with the Certificates as underlying assets.

The appropriate Russian law N 102 ФЕДЕРАЛЬНЫЙ ЗАКОН ОБ ИПОТЕКЕ called Federal Mortgage Law was passed on 16.07.1998. This law regulates mortgage lending issues including definition and mandatory parameters of Russian Mortgage Certificate.

It is possible to download  the more or less standardized template from the site of the Russian State Agency  carrying
functions similar to those of Fannie Mae, Freddy Mac or Ginnie Mae in USA.

External links
Mortgage - Investopedia definition
Mortgage - Investorwords definition
Site containing some issues relating to Russian Mortgage Certificates

Mortgage
Finance in Russia